Brugsen, the Danish contraction of Brugsforeningen, may refer to:
 Brugsen supermarket chain in Denmark, owned by Coop amba
 Brugsen or Brugseni supermarket chain in Greenland. The company name is Kalaallit Nunaanni Brugseni AmbA